The Welchman was a Welsh 19th century magazine, It was first produced by John Frost, the future Chartist leader of the Newport rising in 1832. It contained selections of politically radical articles written by John Frost. It is thought that Frost's own writing in The Welchman was largely inspired by the writings and speeches of William Cobbett.

References 

Periodicals published in Wales
Magazines published in Wales
Political magazines published in the United Kingdom